Emanuele Manitta (born 12 January 1977) is a retired Italian football goalkeeper.

Football career

Early career
A native of Caltagirone, Sicily, he spent one season at youth rank of A.S. Bari before to move to Sicilian amateur club U.S. Ragusa, at that time at Serie D. He then moved to Peloro Calcio of Serie D. In summer 1997, Peloro merged with Messina, at that time at Serie D.

Messina
At Messina, he helped the club gain promotion to Serie C2 in summer 1998, and to Serie C1 in summer 2000.

He won a loan contract from U.S. Lecce in summer 2000, but did not play.

He returned to Messina in summer 2001, this time at Serie B.

He won another loan contract from S.S.C. Napoli (Serie B) in January 2003, to replace Marco Storari, later the move became permanent. He played 41 out of 42 Serie B games that season.

But Napoli faced bankrupt in summer 2004, he started his career that finding a club in every summer.

Later career
He was first for Catanzaro (Serie B), but the club almost failed to protect her place on Serie B. He then joined Bologna as backup of Gianluca Pagliuca in Serie B, where he just made 2 appearances.

In summer 2006, he joined Livorno, where he made his Serie A debut on 21 January 2007 in a 1–1 draw against A.S. Roma. As a backup for Marco Amelia, he also played 8 Serie A games, but none in the 2006–07 UEFA Cup.

In summer 2007, he moved back to Messina, ahead Gabriele Paoletti as first choice, where he played 30 Serie B games. Following the disbandment of the Sicilian club, he was released for free in July 2008, and later signed by Siena on 3 October 2008 as an emergency replacement for Dimitrios Eleftheropoulos.

Honours
Messina
Serie D: 1997–98
Serie C2: 1999–2000

References

External links
 Profile at Soccerway

1977 births
Living people
People from Caltagirone
Italian footballers
Association football goalkeepers
S.S.C. Bari players
A.C.R. Messina players
U.S. Lecce players
S.S.C. Napoli players
Bologna F.C. 1909 players
U.S. Livorno 1915 players
A.C.N. Siena 1904 players
U.S. Catanzaro 1929 players
Serie A players
Serie B players
Serie D players
Footballers from Sicily
Sportspeople from the Province of Catania